The 1993 Omloop Het Volk was the 47th edition of the Omloop Het Volk cycle race and was held on 27 February 1993. The race started and finished in Ghent. The race was won by Wilfried Nelissen.

General classification

References

1993
Omloop Het Nieuwsblad
Omloop Het Nieuwsblad
February 1993 sports events in Europe